Anger Management is a 2003 American buddy comedy film directed by Peter Segal and written by David S. Dorfman. Starring Adam Sandler and Jack Nicholson with Marisa Tomei, Luis Guzmán, Woody Harrelson and John Turturro in supporting roles, the film tells the story of a businessman who is sentenced to an anger management program under a renowned therapist with unconventional methods. Anger Management was released in theaters in the United States on April 11, 2003, by Columbia Pictures. It received mixed reviews from critics and grossed $195 million against a $75 million budget.

Plot

In 1978 Brooklyn, as a young boy, Dave Buznik is about to experience his first kiss, he is humiliated by local bully Arnie Shankman who suddenly pulls down his pants and underwear.

Twenty-five years later, Dave works as a secretary for a disrespectful boss named Frank. Dave's bullying trauma causes him to avoid displaying affection such as kissing his girlfriend Linda in public. His problems are exacerbated by his narcissistic co-worker, Andrew, who is close friends with Linda and desires to rekindle their romantic relationship.

During a flight, Dave loses his temper, albeit mildly, after being treated disrespectfully by the flight attendant, prompting the sky marshal to taser him. He is arrested for "assaulting" a flight attendant and is sentenced to anger management under Dr. Buddy Rydell, a renowned therapist who sat next to him on the plane. Dave's sentence is extended to 30 days after he accidentally breaks a waitress's nose while defending himself from a blind man's cane.

Buddy imposes "radical round-the-clock therapy", living with Dave and accompanying him at work. This entails unorthodox techniques which cause him to be passive aggressive. At work Buddy is shocked to learn of the well-endowed Andrew's friendship with Linda. However, seeing a photo of Linda he becomes instantly smitten with her, annoying Dave.

To enhance Dave's assertiveness, Buddy arranges for him to get revenge on Arnie Shankman, who has become a Buddhist monk. Arnie apologizes, but then laughs when reminded of the kiss incident. Buddy and an initially hesitant Dave provoke Arnie by lying about Dave molesting Arnie's mentally ill sister. A fight ensues, and after defeating Arnie the duo flee and Dave is delighted to have had his revenge.

Linda tells Dave she has agreed to follow Buddy's advice that they have a trial separation; Buddy explains to Dave that this is to give him time to improve his behavior. Dave attacks him when he learns he is dating Linda. Dave returns to court where Buddy issues a restraining order against him for attempting to choke him while wearing a neck brace (which later turned out to be fake). Dave snaps at work when he learns Frank promoted Andrew to the position he had expected. He punches Andrew in the face and wrecks Frank's office with a golf club.

Learning from Andrew that Buddy has taken Linda to a New York Yankees game, Dave assumes Buddy intends to steal his marriage proposal idea and races to the stadium. Security captures him, but New York Mayor Rudy Giuliani orders them to allow Dave to speak. Linda is moved when Dave announces publicly that he is willing to change. At her request, he kisses her in front of the crowd and she accepts his proposal. Linda then reveals that the game was the final phase of his therapy and explains that the aggravation he endured was all Buddy's doing. She adds that most of the people involved were in on Buddy's plans to help Dave stand up for himself.

Cast
 Adam Sandler as David "Dave" Buznik
 Jonathan Osser as Young Dave Buznik
 Jack Nicholson as Dr. Buddy Rydell
 Marisa Tomei as Linda
 Luis Guzmán as Lou
 Jonathan Loughran as Nate
 Kurt Fuller as Frank Head
 Krista Allen as Stacy
 January Jones as Gina
 Clint Black as Masseur
 John Turturro as Chuck
 Lynne Thigpen as Judge Brenda Daniels
 This film turned out to be Thigpen's final film. She died a month before the film's release; the film is dedicated in her memory.
 Woody Harrelson as Galaxia the prostitute/Gary the Security Guard
 Kevin Nealon as Sam, Dave's Lawyer
 Allen Covert as Andrew
 Nancy Carell as Patty the Flight Attendant
 John C. Reilly (uncredited) as Older Monk Arnie Shankman
 Alan James Morgan as Young Arnie Shankman
 Heather Graham (uncredited) as Kendra
 Harry Dean Stanton (uncredited) as Blind Man
 Isaac C. Singleton Jr. as Air Marshal 
 Stephen Dunham as Maitre d'
 Cody Arens as Boy at Yankee Stadium

Several others appeared as themselves, such as:
 John McEnroe
 Derek Jeter
 Robert Merrill
 Bob Sheppard
 Judith Nathan
 Bob Knight
 Roger Clemens
 Rudy Giuliani

Release
Anger Management was number one at the box office on its opening weekend, April 11–13, 2003, earning $42.2 million. It earned a total of $135.6 million in the U.S. with a total worldwide box office of $195.7 million.

Reception
On Metacritic the film has a weighted average score of 52 out of 100 based on 39 critics, indicating "mixed or average reviews". Audiences surveyed by CinemaScore gave the film an average grade of "B" on an A+ to F scale.

Roger Ebert for the Chicago Sun-Times wrote: "The concept is inspired. The execution is lame. Anger Management, a film that might have been one of Adam Sandler's best, becomes one of Jack Nicholson's worst." Caroline Westbrook for Empire magazine thought "A better script and more attention to other cast members would have helped but, as it stands, this is still the best Adam Sandler comedy since The Wedding Singer."

Accolades

The film won and was nominated for a number of awards throughout 2004–2005.

TV series adaptation

A television series based on the film premiered on June 28, 2012, starring Charlie Sheen in the role originated by Jack Nicholson; the series was Sheen's first acting role since his firing from the hit CBS sitcom Two and a Half Men on March 7, 2011, after eight seasons. The show was produced by the film's producer Joe Roth, and was broadcast on FX in the United States, CTV in Canada and on TBS in Latin America for two seasons, totalling 100 episodes before it was cancelled.

References

External links

 
 

2003 comedy films
2003 films
2000s buddy comedy films
American buddy comedy films
American comedy films
Czech comedy films
Columbia Pictures films
2000s English-language films
Films adapted into television shows
Films directed by Peter Segal
Films produced by Jack Giarraputo
Films scored by Teddy Castellucci
Films set in New York City
Films shot in New York City
Films about psychiatry
Happy Madison Productions films
Midlife crisis films
Revolution Studios films
2000s American films